is a former Japanese football player.

Playing career
Suzuki was born in Shibetsu on June 2, 1980. After graduating from high school, he joined J1 League club Bellmare Hiratsuka (later Shonan Bellmare) in 1999. However he could hardly play in the match and the club was relegated to J2 League from 2000. In 2001, he moved to J2 club Montedio Yamagata. He played as regular left side back in 2 seasons. In 2003, he moved to Tokyo Verdy. Although he played as regular player from May, he could not play at all in the match from June. In July, he moved to J2 club Albirex Niigata and became a regular player as left side back. The club also won the champions in 2003 and was promoted to J1 from 2004. However his opportunity to play decreased from 2004. In 2007, he moved to Ventforet Kofu. However he could hardly play in the match and retired end of 2007 season.

Club statistics

References

External links

1980 births
Living people
Association football people from Hokkaido
Japanese footballers
J1 League players
J2 League players
Shonan Bellmare players
Montedio Yamagata players
Tokyo Verdy players
Albirex Niigata players
Ventforet Kofu players
Association football defenders